The 2013–14 Anaheim Ducks season was the 21st season for the National Hockey League (NHL) franchise. The Ducks achieved their best regular season record in franchise history, amassing 116 points and finishing first in the Western Conference and second in the NHL, behind the Boston Bruins by only a single point. However, the Ducks only won one playoff series; after defeating the Dallas Stars in six games in the first round, they fell in seven games to their crosstown rival Los Angeles Kings in the Western Conference Semifinal.

This was Teemu Selanne's final season, following 23 NHL seasons and 15 in which he played for Anaheim. It was also Saku Koivu’s final season.

Standings

Schedule and results

Pre-season

Regular season

Playoffs 

The Anaheim Ducks entered the playoffs as the Pacific Division's first seed. They defeated the Dallas Stars in the first round, winning the best-of-seven series four games to two. The series included a Game 6 comeback wherein the Ducks scored a game-tying goal with 24 seconds remaining and then won the game in overtime.

The Ducks faced their crosstown rival Los Angeles Kings in the second round. The Ducks would fall behind 2–0 to begin the series, tie the series 2–2 and take their first lead after Game 5. They would not win again, however, as the Kings won the series 4–3 in a Game 7 decision.

Player statistics 
Final Stats
Skaters

Goaltenders

†Denotes player spent time with another team before joining the Ducks.  Stats reflect time with the Ducks only.
‡Denotes player was traded mid-season.  Stats reflect time with the Team only.
Bold/italics denotes franchise record.

Awards and records

Awards

Transactions 
The Ducks have been involved in the following transactions during the 2013–14 season.

Trades

Free agents signed

Free agents lost

Players signings

Draft picks 

Anaheim Ducks' picks at the 2013 NHL Entry Draft, to be held in Newark, New Jersey on June 30, 2013.

Draft notes
 The New York Islanders' second-round pick went to the Anaheim Ducks as a result of a June 22, 2012, trade that sent Lubomir Visnovsky to the Islanders in exchange for this pick.
 The Anaheim Ducks' second-round pick went to the Edmonton Oilers as the result of a July 12, 2011, trade that sent Andrew Cogliano to the Ducks in exchange for this pick.
 The Anaheim Ducks' fourth-round pick went to the San Jose Sharks (via Toronto and Chicago), Anaheim traded this pick to the Toronto Maple Leafs as the result of a February 9, 2011, trade that sent Francois Beauchemin to the Ducks in exchange for Joffrey Lupul, Jake Gardiner and this pick.
 The Anaheim Ducks' seventh-round pick went to the San Jose Sharks (via Colorado), Anaheim traded this pick to the Colorado Avalanche as the result of an October 8, 2011, trade that sent Kyle Cumiskey to the Ducks in exchange for Jake Newton and this pick.

References 

Anaheim Ducks seasons
Anaheim Ducks season, 2013-14
Mighty
Mighty Ducks of Anaheim
Mighty Ducks of Anaheim